Sweet Sweet Bodyguard is a 2012 Taiwanese television series starring Alien Huang and Summer Meng, and directed by Golden Bell Award-winning director Fung Kai.

The drama began filming on 6 June 2012 and debuted on 31 July 2012, airing daily at 8pm on cable TV SET Metro and ending on 26 November 2012 at a total of 82 episodes.

Synopsis
Raised up in a military family and trained to become a bodyguard, Zhen Ai-Ji (played by Summer Meng) is all about responsibility, loyalty and honor. But at heart, she is an ordinary young girl who is eager to fall in love. In order to prevent herself from becoming a "leftover girl" at too early of an age, she decided that her next mission will also be her last one. However, what she did not expect was that her new client, He Zhong-Qi (played by Alien Huang) the CEO of a famous motor company, would be such a difficult person to get along with...

Cast

Main

Supporting

Soundtrack

External links
 Sweet Sweet Bodyguard Official FACEBOOK Fanpage
 Sweet Sweet Bodyguard Official SETTV Blog
 Sweet Sweet Bodyguard Official ETTV Blog
 Sweet Sweet Bodyguard Official WEIBO Microblog

Sanlih E-Television original programming
2012 Taiwanese television series debuts
2012 Taiwanese television series endings
Eastern Television original programming